Almabruk Mahmud Mahmud is a Libyan weightlifter. He competed in the men's flyweight event at the 1980 Summer Olympics.

References

Year of birth missing (living people)
Living people
Libyan male weightlifters
Olympic weightlifters of Libya
Weightlifters at the 1980 Summer Olympics
Place of birth missing (living people)